29th and Gay is a 2005 American comedy film directed by Carrie Preston and starring James Vasquez, Nicole Marcks, David McBean, Mike Doyle, and Annie Hinton. It was Vasquez's first experience as a writer, actor, and editor. The film premiered at the 2005 Miami Gay & Lesbian Film Festival.

Plot
James Sanchez is a 29-year-old gay man who feels he has reached a dead end in his life. While his best friend Roxy, an actress-turned-activist, struggles to show him there is life beyond the glitz of the disco ball, his other friend, Brandon works on getting James to socialize. Feeling out of place in the world and caught between his Hispanic-American heritage and his homosexuality, James grows, realizing that life is in the journey, not the destination.

Throughout his long journey to find a partner, James dates many different men, many of whom he meets in gay bars. He attempts to find a man online, which leads him to Mike. They go on a date, which seems to be "perfect," but Mike never calls back. Throughout his relationship troubles, James also deals with his parents, who try to be much too accepting (they buy him overly stereotypical gifts such as musicals and a sex swing for special occasions), a lack of a job, a lack of inspiration for his talents as an actor and his lack of confidence to approach the man he has a crush on, the hot and sexy coffee barista in the cafe down the street. After going through friendship troubles, all too depressing moments and losing his apartment's electricity, he struggles his way back into life by getting an acting job and perhaps finding the man of his dreams.

Cast
James Vasquez as James Sanchez
Nicole Marcks as Roxy Hymen
David McBean as Brandon Bouvier / Shakespeare Musical Performer
Mike Doyle as Andy Griffith
Annie Hinton as Mom
Kali Rocha as Clinic Nurse
Michael Emerson as "Gorilla" Co-Worker
Adam Greer as Steve
James Synjyn as Dad
Kurt Norby as Mike
Rob MacAuley as Troy
Ari Lerner as James, age 8
Edward Ortiz Vásquez as James, age 13
Zev Lerner as James, age 14
Rachel Pearson as Sally Guadalajara
Sandra Ellis-Troy as Madame Paula

References

External links 
 

2005 comedy films
2005 LGBT-related films
2005 films
American comedy films
American LGBT-related films
LGBT-related comedy films
Films directed by Carrie Preston
Gay-related films
2005 directorial debut films
2000s English-language films
2000s American films